The broadgill catshark (Apristurus riveri) is a catshark of the family Scyliorhinidae, found in the Gulf of Mexico and the Caribbean Sea, between 30°N and 9° N, on the continental slopes at depths between 700 and 1,500 m. Its length is up to 46 cm. The reproduction of the broadgill catshark is oviparous.

References

 

broadgill catshark
Fish of the Gulf of Mexico
Fish of the Caribbean
Fish of the Dominican Republic
Taxa named by Henry Bryant Bigelow
Taxa named by William Charles Schroeder
broadgill catshark